The minimum purchasing age for tobacco in the United States before 2020 varied by state and territory. Since December 20, 2019, the smoking age in all states and territories is 21 after federal law was passed by Congress and signed by former President Donald Trump.

History 

In the United States, laws regarding the minimum age to purchase and consume tobacco products have been made by states, territories, the District of Columbia and the federal government. Before 1992, states had the sole power to enforce their own minimum ages. These laws first appeared in the late 19th-century, with New Jersey becoming the first state to set a minimum purchase age of sixteen in 1883. By 1920, around half of states had their minimum purchase age of twenty-one and some simply prohibited "minors" (ages 14–24) from purchasing. During the 1920s, due to tobacco industry lobbying, the minimum ages were lowered across the U.S. and ranged from sixteen to nineteen. By 1939, all states had age restrictions for tobacco. However, these laws kept changing throughout the 1950s, with Maryland repealing its age restrictions. The American Cancer Society recommended the minimum age of eighteen in 1963, the American Medical Association recommended twenty-one in 1985, and the United States Department of Health and Human Services Office of the Inspector General recommended nineteen or twenty-one.

State tobacco laws partly changed in 1992 under the Bill Clinton administration when Congress enacted the Synar Amendment, forcing states to create their own laws to have a minimum age of eighteen to purchase tobacco or else lose funding from the Substance Abuse and Mental Health Services Administration. The amendment was passed in response to the teenage smoking rates. All states raised their ages to either eighteen or nineteen by 1993. In 1997, the Food and Drug Administration enacted regulations making the federal minimum age eighteen, though later the U.S. Supreme Court later terminated the FDA's jurisdiction over tobacco, ending its enforcement practices and leaving it up to states.

In 2009, the Family Smoking Prevention and Tobacco Control Act was enacted under the Barack Obama administration, once again setting a federal minimum age of eighteen and prohibited the FDA from setting a higher minimum purchase age. From 1993 to 2012, the smoking age in all states was either eighteen or nineteen. In 2005, the town of Needham, Massachusetts became the first jurisdiction in the country to raise the minimum purchase age to 21. Between 2012 and 2015, local municipalities across the U.S. began raising their smoking ages to twenty-one, with Hawaii becoming the first state to raise its age to twenty-one in 2015. This began the shift in states eventually raising their ages to twenty-one due to the teenage vaping crisis. By 2019, eighteen states had their minimum purchase ages at twenty-one, thirty states had their ages at eighteen, two had it at nineteen and the District of Columbia had it at twenty-one. On December 20, 2019, with the enactment of the Appropriations for Fiscal Year 2020 signed by President Donald Trump, the federal smoking age was raised to twenty-one by changing the minimum purchase age in the 1992 Synar Amendment. The United States Department of Defense followed, raising the age to purchase tobacco to twenty-one on military bases in the U.S. and abroad.

Laws by state

See also 

Age of candidacy
Age of consent
Ages of consent in the United States
Age of majority – when a minor becomes a legal adult
Family Smoking Prevention and Tobacco Control Act
Legal drinking age – worldwide view of drinking ages
Legal drinking age controversy in the United States
Mature minor doctrine
Marriageable age
Marriage age in the United States
Smoking age – worldwide view of smoking ages
 Shoulder tap (alcohol)
List of smoking bans
Voting age
Youth rights
Youth suffrage

Notes

References 

Smoking in the United States
Juvenile law
United States law-related lists
Tobacco U.S. minimum purchase age by state
Drug control law in the United States
History of drug control in the United States